Rizoma (before 1927: Σκλάταινα - Sklataina) is a village in the Trikala regional unit, Thessaly, Greece. In the 2011 census it reported 917 residents. It lies at 160 meters above sea level, 12 km north of the city of Trikala. It has an agricultural economy with tobacco being the main product.

The village is the seat of the Paralithaioi municipal unit and it is inhabited by Karagounides, the most commonly used name for the residents of the Thessalian plain. According to the legend this name was given to them by Alexander the Great when he passed through the region in 335 BC on his way to Thebes.

The most prominent figure that was born there was the priest-monk Saint Theophilus (mid-16th century) who is recorded as the founder of the Saint Stephen Monastery in Meteora.

To the north of the town, there is a low hill called Tzougza, where trenches dug in WW2 can still be seen.

References

Populated places in Trikala (regional unit)